Batum is a former name of Batumi, a seaside city on the Black Sea coast and capital of Adjara, an autonomous republic in southwest Georgia.

Batum may also refer to:

People with the surname
 Nicolas Batum, French professional basketball player
 Süheyl Batum, Turkish academic

See also
Treaty of Batum, a treaty signed by the Democratic Republic of Armenia and the Ottoman Empire